Oxford Mountain is a mountain in the New York–New Jersey Highlands of the Appalachian Mountains in Warren County, New Jersey. Oxford Mountain is separated from County House Mountain to the northeast at Sykes Gap, and forms a part of the divide between Pohatcong Creek and the Pequest River.

References

Mountains of Warren County, New Jersey
Mountains of New Jersey